The canton of Dun-le-Palestel is a canton situated in the Creuse département and in the Nouvelle-Aquitaine region of central France.

Geography 
An area of valleys and plateaux, consisting of woodland and farmland, with the town of Dun-le-Palestel, in the arrondissement of Guéret, at its centre. 
The altitude varies from 197m (Crozant) to 546m (Saint-Sulpice-le-Dunois) with an average altitude of 306m.

Composition 
At the French canton reorganisation which came into effect in March 2015, the canton was expanded from 13 to 17 communes:
 
Azerables
Bazelat
La Celle-Dunoise
La Chapelle-Baloue
Colondannes
Crozant
Dun-le-Palestel
Fresselines
Lafat
Maison-Feyne
Naillat
Nouzerolles
Sagnat
Saint-Germain-Beaupré
Saint-Sébastien
Saint-Sulpice-le-Dunois
Villard

Population

See also 
 Arrondissements of the Creuse department
 Cantons of the Creuse department
 Communes of the Creuse department

References

Dun-le-Palestel